Jerry L. Nailor (born July 27, 1946) was a Republican member of the Pennsylvania House of Representatives, representing the 88th District from 1989 until his retirement in 2008, prior to the 2008 election and was succeeded by Republican Sheryl M. Delozier.   He and his wife live in Mechanicsburg, Pennsylvania.

References

External links
Pennsylvania House of Representatives - Jerry L. Nailor official PA House website
Pennsylvania House Republican Caucus - Representative Jerry L. Nailor official Party website
Biography, voting record, and interest group ratings at Project Vote Smart

1946 births
Living people
Republican Party members of the Pennsylvania House of Representatives
People from Mechanicsburg, Pennsylvania